Frans Maas (born 13 July 1964, in Bergen op Zoom) is a retired Dutch long jumper, best known for his gold medal at the 1988 European Indoor Championships.

International competitions

References

1964 births
Living people
Dutch male long jumpers
Sportspeople from Bergen op Zoom
World Athletics Championships athletes for the Netherlands
20th-century Dutch people